Petaloctenus is a genus of African wandering spiders first described by Rudy Jocqué & T. Steyn in 1997.

Species
 it contains five species:
Petaloctenus bossema Jocqué & Steyn, 1997 (type) – Ivory Coast
Petaloctenus clathratus (Thorell, 1899) – Cameroon
Petaloctenus cupido Van der Donckt & Jocqué, 2001 – Guinea
Petaloctenus lunatus Van der Donckt & Jocqué, 2001 – Nigeria
Petaloctenus songan Jocqué & Steyn, 1997 – Ivory Coast

References

Araneomorphae genera
Ctenidae
Spiders of Africa